Ángel Magaña (August 24, 1915 – November 13, 1982) was an Argentine film actor who appeared in some of Argentina's notable films of the 1930s, 1940s and 1950s.

He was married to Nuri Montsé

Filmography
Hotel de señoritas (1979) 	
El juicio de Dios (inconclusa - 1979) 	
Así es la vida, Alberto Castañares
Dos locos en el aire (1976) 	
Los chantas (1975), Aurelio
Andrea (1973)
Adiós Alejandra (1973) 	
Mi amigo Luis (1972) 	
La sonrisa de mamá (1972), Damián
La familia hippie (1971) 	
¡Viva la vida! (1969) 	
Flor de piolas (1967) 	
La Cigarra está que arde (1967) 	
Viaje de una noche de verano (1965) 	
La industria del matrimonio (1964), (episodio "Correo sentimental")
Ritmo nuevo, vieja ola (1964), Dr. Marcelo Maines
La Cigarra no es un bicho (1963)
Historia de una carta (1957) 	
Requiebro (1955) 	
El cura Lorenzo (1954) 	
Los ojos llenos de amor (1954) 	
Un ángel sin pudor (1953) 	
Don't Ever Open That Door (1952), Raúl Valdez (episodio "Alguien al teléfono")
Vuelva el primero! (1952) 	
Cosas de mujer (1951) 	
Arroz con leche (1950) 	
Esposa último modelo (1950), Alfredo Villegas
Cuando besa mi marido (1950) 	
Piantadino (1950) 	
La cuna vacía (1949) 	
La calle grita (1948) 	
Nunca te diré adiós (1947) 	
El muerto falta à la cita (1944), Daniel Rivero
His Best Student (1944)	
Cuando florezca el naranjo (1943) 	
La Guerra Gaucha (1942) 	
Adolescencia (1942) 	
Yo quiero morir contigo (1941), Mauricio Berardi
El mejor papá del mundo (1941) 	
Fragata Sarmiento (1940) 	
Héroes sin fama (1940) 	
Prisioneros de la tierra (1939) 	
El viejo doctor (1939) 	
Puerta cerrada (1938), Daniel
Kilómetro 111 (1938) 	
Con las alas rotas (1938) 	
Viento Norte (1937) 	
Cadetes de San Martín (1937) 	
El caballo del pueblo (1935), Extra

External links
 

1915 births
1982 deaths
Argentine male film actors
People from Buenos Aires
20th-century Argentine male actors